

Rudolf Petersen (15 June 1905 – 2 January 1983) was a German naval officer during World War II. Petersen, in his role as Commodore, was the head of the court of what might have been the last desertion-trial of Nazi Germany. Matrose Fritz Wehrmann, age 26 from Leipzig, Funker Alfred Gail, age 20 from Kassel, and Obergefreiter Martin Schilling, age 22 from Ostfriesland were executed on board  on 10 May 1945 two days after the unconditional surrender of Germany.

The accused had received news of the German capitulation to the British forces on 4 May 1945. On 6 May 1945 they left their stations on Svendborg on Fünen to get to the mainland. They were caught by the Danish Police and handed over to the German authorities on Fünen.

Awards 
 Iron Cross (1939)  2nd Class (1940) & 1st Class (28 May 1940)
 Fast Attack Craft War Badge (19 March 1942) with Diamonds (13 June 1944)
 Knight's Cross of the Iron Cross with Oak Leaves
 Knight's Cross on 4 August 1940 as Korvettenkapitän and chief of the 2. Schnellbootflottille
 Oak Leaves on 13 June 1944 as Kapitän zur See and leader of the Schnellboote (FdS)

References

Citations

Bibliography

External links
Berliner Zeitung Article about the desertion trial
 

1905 births
1983 deaths
Reichsmarine personnel
Kriegsmarine personnel of World War II
Recipients of the Knight's Cross of the Iron Cross with Oak Leaves
People from Sønderborg Municipality